Hyde Group is a housing association in London. It is a member of the G15. It operates in London, the South East, the East of England and the East Midlands.

Hyde Housing Association was established in 1967 following a meeting in Sidcup to help people excluded from the mainstream housing market, by providing them with decent, affordable homes and managing them properly. Its core aim is to provide housing for those people who are unable to meet their needs on the open market.

It has completed several large-scale regeneration projects, transforming run down areas, such as Packington Square in Islington.

Hyde has over 50,000 properties providing housing to 100,000 residents, and over 1,100 employees. Its 2018 annual turnover from housing services was over £250 million, and total turnover including sales was over £330 million.

In 2016 Hyde was in merger discussions with London and Quadrant, which would have formed the largest housing association in Europe, but withdrew.

Awards
National Home Improvement Council awards for the sustainability of its 'retro-fit and replicate' house in 2009
Most Innovative Marketing Approach, Affordable Home Ownership Awards 2009 and 2010 for schemes in Brighton and London
RICS 2010 Award for Regeneration: for transformation of the Stonebridge Estate, North London
Best New Place to Live: London Planning Awards 2010, for new homes at Bermondsey Spa, London, SE1
Best Regeneration Project, Housebuilder Awards 2010 – Innovation and Excellence – Bermondsey Spa, London, SE1
The Best New Regeneration Project, London Evening Standard New Homes Award 2010 – Bermondsey Spa, London, SE1
Best Development 2011: Daily Telegraph British Home Awards or Packington, London
Best Partnership Working 2011: National Housing Federation, London Region 'What we are proud of awards" for Packington, London
1st place London Excellence Awards 2011: for Partners for Improvement
National Housing Awards 2013: Provider of the Year and Best Large Development and Best Regeneration Project for Packington Square in Islington.

Controversies
In January 2022 Corporate Watch collated a list of controversies linked to Hyde Group including: unsafe cladding, substandard accommodation, evictions, and resistance to Hyde developments.

Unsafe Cladding

In February 2018, the Guardian reported that the action taken by Hyde to limit the risk of fire in Greenwich's New Capital Quay – the largest housing development in the country to have Grenfell-style cladding – was the “least efficient” solution of the three recommended by the London Fire Brigade.

In November 2020, two housing blocks owned by Hyde in Brighton's New England Quarter were put on ‘waking watch’ – with 24-hour patrols in case fire broke out – after they failed fire safety checks post Grenfell. Leaseholders in the buildings also found themselves in the position where they were unable to sell due to the building's fire safety status.

In June 2021, Southwark News reported that Davoll Court – a building in Bermondsey – had not been awarded a fire safety certificate. One resident of Davoll Court – who owned a 25% stake in his home – was unable to sell because of the building's fire safety status. He had fallen behind with his rent after his relationship broke down with the co-owner of the property. Hyde Housing ignored the predicament he was in and repossessed his home.

References

External links

Housing associations based in England
Housing organisations based in London